Macrostelia is a genus in the tribe Hibisceae - in the family Malvaceae. The genus consists of three species: M. calyculata Hochr., M. involucrata Hochr., and M. laurina (Baill.) Hochr. & Humbert.  Macrostelias - all native to Madagascar - distinguish themselves from most other genera in Hibisceae by typically bearing flowers with a long corolla tube. Although members of Hibiscus - an example of one of these other genera - may bear flowers with proximally connate petals, such connation occurs only at the very base of the petals.

In the past, Macrostelia was considered to consist of at least a total of four species. The fourth species - formerly named Macrostelia grandifolia P.A. Fryxell - is now considered to be under the circumscription of Hibiscus.

References

Hibisceae
Malvaceae genera